Colin McManus (born March 10, 1990) is an American former competitive ice dancer. With his skating partner, Anastasia Cannuscio, he is the 2013 Ice Challenge champion, a three-time bronze medalist on the ISU Challenger Series, and the 2016 U.S. national pewter medalist.

Personal life 
McManus was born on March 10, 1990, in Melrose, Massachusetts. He married American ice dancer Isabella Cannuscio, his skating partner's sister, on May 27, 2018. On November 27, 2021, the couple announced they were expecting their first child, a boy, due in May 2022. Finn James McManus was born on May 16, 2022.

Career 
Colin McManus teamed up with Anastasia Cannuscio in March 2008. They were coached by Karen Ludington, Christie Moxley-Hutson, and Alexandr Kirsanov at the University of Delaware in Newark, Delaware. The two debuted on the ISU Junior Grand Prix series in autumn 2009.

Cannuscio/McManus won a silver medal at the 2010 Junior Grand Prix event in France and bronze on the junior level at the 2011 U.S. Championships. They were sent to the 2011 World Junior Championships and finished 7th.

Cannuscio/McManus made their senior-level debut at the 2011 Ondrej Nepela Memorial. They finished seventh at their first Grand Prix event, the 2012 Skate America. The following season, they won gold at the 2013 Ice Challenge.

In the 2014–2015 season, Cannuscio/McManus took bronze at both of their ISU Challenger Series events – the Finlandia Trophy and the U.S. International Classic. They placed fifth at their Grand Prix assignment, the 2014 Skate America, as well as the 2015 U.S. Championships.

Cannuscio/McManus received the pewter medal for fourth place at the 2016 U.S. Championships. They announced their retirement from competition in May 2017.

Programs 
(with Cannuscio)

Competitive highlights 
GP: Grand Prix; CS: Challenger Series; JGP: Junior Grand Prix

With Cannuscio

References

External links 
 
 Anastasia Cannuscio / Colin McManus at IceNetwork.com

American male ice dancers
1990 births
Living people
Malden Catholic High School alumni
People from Melrose, Massachusetts
People from Saugus, Massachusetts
People from Newark, Delaware
Sportspeople from the Delaware Valley
Sportspeople from Essex County, Massachusetts
Sportspeople from Middlesex County, Massachusetts